Sandra Novack (born 1972) is an American writer of a novel and short stories.  Her debut novel, Precious, was a Booklist Top 10 First Novels of 2009.

Biography
Novack was born in Bethlehem, Pennsylvania to Joanne Novack, a court systems operator at Lehigh County Courthouse, and Joseph Novack, a former millwright at Bethlehem Steel.  She received her Master of Fine Arts from Vermont College of Fine Arts in 2003.  Her short stories have been published in The Gettysburg Review, The Iowa Review, Gulf Coast, Descant, and Chattahoochee Review. 

Stephen King named Novack's story "Memphis" a "Distinguished Story" in  The Best American Short Stories in 2007. She has been nominated three times for a Pushcart Prize, her nonfiction work “Hunk” was nominated as a runner-up for the 2006 Iowa Review Award, and she is a recipient of the 2010-2011 Christopher Isherwood Foundation Fellowship and 2011 Illinois Arts Council grant.  Her short story collection, Everyone But You, was published by Random House in 2011, and she is working on a new novel.  Her work has been translated to Dutch. Novack lives in Oak Park, Illinois.

Works

Novels
Precious (2009)

Short Stories
Everyone But You (2011)

References

External links
Official website
Random House profile
buzzsugar.com interview
Baton Rouge Advocate interview
Curled Up With a Good Book interview

1972 births
Living people
21st-century American novelists
21st-century American short story writers
21st-century American women writers
American women novelists
American women short story writers
Novelists from Pennsylvania
Writers from Bethlehem, Pennsylvania